The Tazzari Zero is a battery electric microcar concept car built by the Tazzari Group, in Imola, Italy, and unveiled in the 2009 Bologna Motor Show.

Specifications
The Tazzari Zero has rear wheel drive and the motor is situated above the rear axles. It is also possible to charge batteries to 80% in 50 minutes using three-phase power supply (380V Superfast charger).

The aluminum-bodied car weighs only  with batteries. The car has normal options like: central locking, electric windows and mirrors, CD/MP3-player and 15-inch alloy wheels.

Price 
Base price was planned in 2009 to start at  plus VAT in the European market.

Gallery

Safety 
The Zero in its standard European configuration received 1 star in the Euro NCAP Quadricycle Ratings in 2014.

See also
 Electric car use by country
 Government incentives for plug-in electric vehicles
 List of modern production plug-in electric vehicles
 List of production battery electric vehicles
 Plug-in electric vehicle
 Renault Zoe

References

External links 

 
 Tazzari zero, at ENISOLA Barcelona
 Tazzari Zero Tech sheet, at Don't worry be creative

Electric concept cars
Production electric cars
Microcars
Quadricycles
Electric city cars
Euro NCAP 2 seat heavy quadricycle
Cars of Italy
2010s cars
Cars introduced in 2009